Manuel Riquelme (2 June 1912, date of death unknown) was a Chilean cyclist. He competed in the three events at the 1936 Summer Olympics.

References

External links
 

1912 births
Year of death missing
Chilean male cyclists
Olympic cyclists of Chile
Cyclists at the 1936 Summer Olympics
Place of birth missing